The Ivory-Handled Gun is a 1935 American Western film directed by Ray Taylor and written by John T. Neville. The film stars Buck Jones, Charlotte Wynters, Walter Miller, Frank Rice, Carl Stockdale and Joseph W. Girard. The film was released on November 11, 1935, by Universal Pictures.

Plot

Cast 
Buck Jones as Buck Ward
Charlotte Wynters as Paddy Moore
Walter Miller as Plunkett aka The Wolverine Kid
Frank Rice as Pike
Carl Stockdale as Bill Ward
Joseph W. Girard as Pat Moore
Niles Welch as Pat Moore as a young man
Eddie Phillips as Bill Ward as a young man
Bob Kortman as Alf Steen
Lee Shumway as Henchman Pete
Stanley Blystone as Squint Barlow
Ben Corbett as Henchman Steve
Lafe McKee as Sheriff Crane
Silver as Silver

References

External links 
 

1935 films
American Western (genre) films
1935 Western (genre) films
Universal Pictures films
Films directed by Ray Taylor
American black-and-white films
1930s English-language films
1930s American films